The municipality of Ponce, Puerto Rico, has 40 beaches including 28 on the mainland and 12 in its offshore islands, primarily at the deserted island of Caja de Muertos. This list of beaches in Ponce, Puerto Rico, consists of some of the most popular beaches in the municipality of Ponce, Puerto Rico. Only natural salt-water beaches are listed.

All beaches in Ponce are public beaches and accessible to the general public at large, except for the beach at the Club Nautico de Ponce, which is accessible to members of that club only. Some public beaches are off-limits to the general public due to preservation or protection efforts. This is the case, for example, of beaches protected under the law by the Puerto Rico Department of Natural and Environmental Resources. Playa Larga beach, in Caja de Muertos, falls in this latter category. None of the beaches in Ponce are among Puerto Rico's 10 most dangerous beaches in terms of number of drownings.

Among beaches in Ponce, a few of the most popular are El Tuque Beach in the El Tuque sector of Barrio Canas, near highway PR-2, west of the city; La Guancha Beach at the La Guancha complex south of the city; and four beaches in Caja de Muertos: Playa Pelícano beach, Playa Larga beach, Playa Carrucho beach, and Playa Blanca beach.  Playa Pelicano beach was the first beach in Puerto Rico - and the entire Caribbean - to attain Blue Flag Beach status. It is also the only beach in the world part of a nature reserve that holds this recognition.  Most beaches in Ponce are small secluded beaches known mostly to local people and accessed by dirt roads. They are part of a coastal stretch in southwestern Puerto Rico "filled with isolated sandy coves and virgin white beaches accessible only by dirt roads that only the locals seem to know about." While there are several family-oriented beaches, like La Guancha and El Tuque, there are also many beaches ideal for sunbathing and relaxation as well as many spots for just being alone. Some beaches are more apt for some types of activities, such as scuba diving, than other beaches. Beaches in Caja de Muertos can be reached via private boat or, during the weekends, via a daily ferry that leaves early in the mornings (reservations are required) from the La Guancha Boardwalk in Barrio Playa.

Ponce beaches are the result of mineral aggregate found in them, and this is, in turn, the result of silt carried by the Ponce river system from the mountains of Cordillera Central. In this manner the composition of its beaches are determined by the geological regions through which the nearby rivers flow. Beaches west of Ponce (El Tuque, Las Salinas, Matilde, etc.) exhibit sand that is mostly white, resulting from its calcareous content, and primarily composed of coral fragments and marine shells.  Beaches east of Ponce (La Guancha, Club Nautico, Hilton, Cabuyon, Vayas, etc.) exhibit sand that is mostly dark sand with magnetite, and composed of fragments of volcanic rock, quartz, and calcareous detritus. Also, the sand at mainland Ponce beaches tends to be generally dark while in the offshore Ponce islands sand is white.

Beach list summary table

Beaches on the Ponce mainland

Beaches at offshore Ponce islands

Gallery

See also

 Puerto Rico Tourism Company
 Porta Caribe

Notes

References

Further reading
 Ambiente: Costas de Puerto Rico, Encyclopedia Puerto Rico
 Cayetano Coll y Toste. Boletin Historico de Puerto Rico. Volume XII. 1924-1925.
 USGS Hydrologic Unit Map – Caribbean Region (1974)

External links

 Isla Caja de Muertos, with coordinates for Playa Pelicano
 Geographic Information and Coordinates for Balneario El Tuque
 USGS Geographic Names Information Service
 Playas de Puerto Rico
 University of Puerto Rico, Recinto Universitario de Mayaguez. Department of Marine Sciences. Geological Oceanography Program. Punta Cucharas Study
 El Tuque Beach
 Sand dunes at Matilda Beach
 Beaches Southwest Puerto Rico: El Tuque Beach. Discover Puerto Rico. 2017. Accessed 28 January 2017.
 Hydrogeology and Hydrology of the Punta Cabullones Wetland Area, Ponce, Southern Puerto Rico, 2007–08. Jesús Rodríguez-Martínez and Luis R. Soler-López. Prepared in cooperation with the Municipio Autónomo de Ponce and the Puerto Rico Department of Natural and Environmental Resources. USGS. Scientific Investigations Report 2014–5102. 20 August 2014. Accessed 28 January 2017.
 Ponce Projects. University of Puerto Rico, Recinto Universitario de Mayaguez. Department of Marine Sciences. Geological Oceanography Program. Accessed 28 January 2017.

.
Beaches, Puerto Rico, Ponce
Lists of beaches in Puerto Rico
Beaches
Tourist attractions in Ponce, Puerto Rico